Sun Secrets is an album by the Eric Burdon Band recorded in 1973 and released in December 1974.

It includes some re-recording of songs, with which lead singer Eric Burdon topped the charts a few years before. The band included Aalon Butler on guitar, Randy Rice on bass and Alvin Taylor on drums.

"The Real Me", "Ring of Fire" and "Don't Let Me Be Misunderstood" were released as singles. The album peaked at No. 51 on the Billboard 200 chart in 1975.

They formed in 1971, after Burdon left his previous band War to cut an album with blues/jazz-great Jimmy Witherspoon. They recorded the album Guilty and then, without Witherspoon, the album Stop.

Track listing
 "It’s My Life" (4:43, Roger Atkins, Carl D’Errico)
 "Ring of Fire" (6:11, June Carter, Merle Kilgore)
 "Medley: When I Was Young / War Child" (8:30, Burdon, Aalon Butler)
 "The Real Me" (3:34, Burdon, Aalon Butler)
 "Medley:Don’t Let Me Be Misunderstood / Nina’s School" (8:25, Bennie Benjamin, Sol Marcus, Gloria Caldwell, Burdon, Aalon Butler)
 "Letter from the County Farm" (13:05, Burdon, Rosco Gordon)
 "Sun Secrets" (3:02, Aalon Butler)

Personnel
Eric Burdon - vocals
Aalon Butler - guitar
Randy Rice - bass
Alvin Taylor - drums
Ed Barton - engineer
Norman Seeff - photography

Re-issues
 In 1993, Avenue Records and Rhino Entertainment combined the albums Sun Secrets and Stop though due to length, the song "Be Mine" (8:10, from Stop) is not included on the compilation.
 Available on quadrophonic 8-track cartridge in 1974 Q8W-11359 on Capitol.

References

1974 albums
Eric Burdon albums
Albums produced by Jerry Goldstein (producer)
Capitol Records albums